Sofia Petrovna Kuvshinnikova, née Safonova (Russian: Софья Петровна Кувшинникова;  1847 – 1907 near Moscow) was a Russian landscape painter. For many years, she was the mistress of Isaac Levitan and served as the inspiration for the lead character in a  short story by Anton Chekhov: Попрыгунья (The Grasshopper, 1892). In 1955, it was adapted for the screen as the first movie directed by Samson Samsonov, with Lyudmila Tselikovskaya in the starring role.

Biography 

She was born to the family of a minor civil servant. After an education which stressed the fine arts, she married Dr Dmitri Kuvshinnikov, a doctor for the police department who was much older.  In 1871, he appeared as one of the figures in a painting by Vasily Perov ("The Hunters at Rest"). This was exhibited at a showing by the Peredvizhniki and, afterwards, his modest apartment became a gathering place for the creative community; a group which came to include Levitan and the Chekhovs. 

Sofia acted as hostess and, for many, was considered one of the chief attractions there. She not only played piano and sewed costumes, she often went out hunting, dressed as a man, and brought back a full bag of game.

In 1886, the Chekhov brothers introduced Levitan to the Kuvshinnikovs. Levitan considered himself to be a "ladies' man" and he soon fixed his sights on Sofia, although she was thirteen years his senior. Often, he would bring his art materials and paint while she played piano. In 1888 he, Sofia, and Alexei Stepanov took a steam trip on the Volga. They found themselves attracted to the town of Plyos and decided to stay. They remained until 1890. It was there she studied with him and improved her amateur painting skills. 

The Grasshopper dates from shortly after this time. The story concerns a lecherous man who has an affair with a married woman, whose husband dies of an accident (that may have been suicide) after she leaves him. Levitan and Kuvshinnikova were both offended although the central figure in the story was a young wife and Kuvshinnikova was 42. Moreover she was dark haired and a talented painter, whereas Chekhov's character was blonde and not an artist. The stronger similarity was that her husband was tolerant of her disloyalty to him, as was "The Grasshopper" who forgave his wife's indiscretions. She, Levitan and her husband travelled together and were considered a ménage à trois.

Chekhov was a close friend of Sofia's and may have had strong affections for her. The story was a way of criticizing her betrayal, both of him and her innocent husband, and created a small scandal. According to the memoirs of Chekhov's brother, Mikhail, the situation almost led to a duel with Levitan, but it was avoided thanks to the intercession of a mutual friend, Tatiana Shchepkina-Kupernik. Nevertheless she and Chekhov were no longer friends. Her husband's understanding was illustrated in the help he later gave to Levitan who, being Jewish, found himself and his family expelled from the city. It was Dr. Kuvshinnikov who interceded with the authorities to allow his wife's lover to return.

It is unclear if there was ever a formal separation from her husband but, in 1894, she and Levitan settled at an estate on Lake Ostrovno in Tver Oblast. Before long, he began another affair with a younger woman from a neighboring estate and she returned to Moscow. They reconciled and broke up twice more; in 1895 and 1897.

From then on, she pursued her own career as a painter and maintained friendships with numerous artists, writers and performers. In August 1907, she was visiting friends at an estate near Moscow, when she fell ill with dysentery and died.

See also
 The Grasshopper (1955 film)

References

External links

"Dr. Dimov of Grasshopper. A Story of medical heroism" by Alexei Mitrofanov @ Miloserdie.

1847 births
1907 deaths
19th-century painters from the Russian Empire
Russian landscape painters
Russian women painters
Anton Chekhov
Deaths from dysentery